HD 69142 is a class K1II-III (orange bright giant) star in the constellation Puppis. Its apparent magnitude is 4.44 and it is approximately 298 light years away based on parallax.

It is a multiple star; the primary is a spectroscopic binary with a 2.55 year orbit with eccentricity 0.4, and there is a more distant companion B at 59.4" and 9.5 magnitude.

References

Puppis
K-type bright giants
Puppis, h2
CD-39 4128
040326
3243
069142